Dinei Florencio is an electrical engineer with Microsoft Research in Redmond, Washington. He was named a Fellow of the Institute of Electrical and Electronics Engineers (IEEE) in 2016 for his contributions to statistical and signal processing approaches to adversarial and security problems.

References

Fellow Members of the IEEE
Living people
Year of birth missing (living people)
Place of birth missing (living people)
American electrical engineers